Lesley Karen Mallin married name Lesley Bryant (born 1956), is a female former athlete who competed for England.

Athletics career
Mallin was a National Champion after winning the 1980 AAA National Championship title in the discus.

She represented England in the discus, at the 1978 Commonwealth Games in Edmonton, Alberta, Canada. After she married she competed under the name Bryant and represented England in the discus, at the 1982 Commonwealth Games in Brisbane, Queensland, Australia.

References

1956 births
English female discus throwers
Athletes (track and field) at the 1978 Commonwealth Games
Living people
Commonwealth Games competitors for England